Paul Kolton (June 1, 1923 – October 27, 2010) was an American reporter, mystery writer and public relations executive who worked for the New York Stock Exchange and became president and then chairman of the American Stock Exchange despite having no prior experience as a stockbroker. As chairman, Kolton oversaw the introduction of options trading.

Early life and education
Born on June 1, 1923, as Paul Komisaruk, he later changed his surname to Kolton as a pen name when he started mystery books. After growing up in Washington Heights, Manhattan, he served in the United States Army during World War II. After completing his military service, he earned his undergraduate degree from the University of North Carolina at Chapel Hill in 1943.

Career

Reporting and NYSE
After working as a reporter for The Journal of Commerce starting in 1946 and as an account executive for a number of advertising agencies, Kolton's first job on Wall Street came when he was hired by the public relations department at the New York Stock Exchange in 1955.

AMEX
He joined the American Stock Exchange in 1962 as its executive vice president. The Amex named him as its president in 1971, making him the first person to be selected from within the exchange to serve as its leader, succeeding Ralph S. Saul, who announced his resignation in March 1971. In November 1972 Kolton was named as the exchange's first CEO and the first salaried top executive of the exchange. Though the American Stock Exchange would ultimately be purchased by the NYSE in 2008, Kolton opposed the idea of a merger while he headed the exchange saying that "two independent, viable exchanges are much more likely to be responsive to new pressures and public needs than a single institution". Kolton announced in July 1977 that he would be leaving his position at the American Exchange in November of that year.

Following his departure from the American Stock Exchange, Kolton served as chair of an accounting standards advisory organization and as a corporate director.

Personal life
A resident of Stamford, Connecticut, Kolton died there, aged 87, on October 27, 2010, from lymphoma. He was survived by his wife, the former Edith Fromme, as well as by a daughter, a son, five grandchildren and a great-grandson.

References

1923 births
2010 deaths
United States Army personnel of World War II
American mystery writers
Novelists from Connecticut
Writers from Manhattan
Deaths from cancer in Connecticut
Deaths from lymphoma
People from Washington Heights, Manhattan
United States Army soldiers
University of North Carolina at Chapel Hill alumni
American male novelists
20th-century American novelists
20th-century American male writers
Novelists from New York (state)